is a Japanese romantic comedy light novel series written by Kakeru Takamine and illustrated by Ichigo Kagawa. The series was published by Futabasha under the Monster Bunko label in Japanese language and Tentai Books in English language. The first volume was released on September 30, 2020 in Japanese and currently has 2 volumes. Tentai Books released the digital version of first volume on July 26, 2021 in English language. In early April, Futabasha decided to discontinue the light novel series after the second volume because it didn't sell well in Japan.

Characters
 Kagami Asahi
 Fuyuka Himuro
 Chiaki Kikkawa
 Hinami Aiba

Volumes

References

External links
 How to Melt the Ice Queen’s Heart on Futabasha 
 How to Melt the Ice Queen’s Heart on Tentai Books

2020 Japanese novels
Light novels